Mind games are a struggle for psychological one-upmanship.

Mind Games or Mind Game may also refer to:

Sports and games
 Mind sport, sports that require significant mental rather than physical effort
In Your House 10: Mind Games, a WWE pay-per-view event
 Mind Games, an annual gaming convention sponsored by American Mensa where the Mensa Select prize is awarded

Books

 BBC MindGames Magazine, a BBC puzzle magazine
 Mind Game (novel), by Christine Feehan
 Mindgame (play), a play by Anthony Horowitz, published 2000
 Mind Games: The Guide to Inner Space, a book by Robert Masters PhD and Jean Houston, from which John Lennon took the title for his song and album
 Mind Games: Amazing Mental Arithmetic Made Easy, a book by George Lane
 The Mind Game (1980) by Norman Spinrad, a novel about the power of cults
 Mind Games (2010) by Carolyn Crane, her debut novel
 Mind Games (book), a 2010 collection of short stories by Richard Thieme
 Mind Games (2019) by Annabel Vernon, about the psychology of elite sport

Film and television 
 Mind Games (1989 film), a 1989 American thriller film
 Mind Games  (2001 film), a 2001 British crime drama film
 Mindgame (Doctor Who), two direct-to-video film dramas based on the TV series Doctor Who in 1997 and 1999
 Mind Game (film), a 2004 Japanese animated film
 Mind Games, a 2006 television movie starring Paul Johansson
 Mind Games (TV series), a 2014 US television series
 Mind Game (TV series), a 2015 Singaporean television series
 "Mind Games" (Kim Possible), an episode of Kim Possible
 "Mind Games" (NCIS), an episode of the television drama NCIS
 "Mind Games", the 54th episode of television series Generator Rex

Music 
 Mindgames (band), a rock band from Belgium

Albums
 Mind Games (John Lennon album), 1973
 Mindgames (album), a 1988 album by saxophonist Greg Osby
 Mind Games (Paul Lamb album), 2010
 Mind Games (Palisades album), 2015

Songs
 "Mind Games" (Banks song), a song by Banks from her 2016 album The Altar
 "Mind Games" (Zard song), a 1999 song by Zard 
"Mind Games" (John Lennon song), 1973
 "Mind Games", a song by Devo from their 2010 album Something for Everybody